Josip Zeba (born 24 April 1990) is a Croatian professional footballer who plays as a defender for Grindavík in Iceland.

References

External links
 
 

1990 births
Living people
People from Kotor Varoš
Association football central defenders
Croatian footballers
HNK Suhopolje players
NK HAŠK players
NK Međimurje players
HNK Segesta players
NK Sesvete players
NK Aluminij players
CS Concordia Chiajna players
Hoang Anh Gia Lai FC players
Grindavík men's football players
First Football League (Croatia) players
Slovenian PrvaLiga players
Liga I players
V.League 1 players
Úrvalsdeild karla (football) players
1. deild karla players
Croatian expatriate footballers
Expatriate footballers in Slovenia
Croatian expatriate sportspeople in Slovenia
Expatriate footballers in Romania
Croatian expatriate sportspeople in Romania
Expatriate footballers in Vietnam
Croatian expatriate sportspeople in Vietnam
Expatriate footballers in Iceland
Croatian expatriate sportspeople in Iceland